Beeston Hydro is a small hydroelectric scheme,  in Beeston, Nottinghamshire. It is located on the River Trent,  and generates up to 1.66 MW of electricity.

History

During 1999, Hyder Industrial Ltd. built the UK's largest "run-of river" hydro-electric plant at Beeston Rylands Weir. The plant was commissioned on 4 January 2000 and later sold on to United Utilities in 2001.

Description

The plant has a design life of twenty years. At the maximum consented flow rate, 60 m3/s of water passes through the pair of turbines. Upstream of the weir and during the salmon migratory period, the plant utilises a bio-acoustic fish-fence—a bubble curtain in which the bubbles contain a sound that the fish do not like. This fish fence steers migrating fish away from the fast-flowing turbine intakes and into the fish ladder, by which the fish can safely negotiate the weir. The power generated supplies enough electricity (1.5 MW–1.66 MW) for two thousand homes, a total of 5.26 GWh annually, it is currently run by Infinis

References

Hydroelectric power stations in England
Buildings and structures in Nottinghamshire
Power stations in the East Midlands
River Trent
Beeston, Nottinghamshire